Bis(pyridine)iodonium(I) tetrafluoroborate or Barluenga's reagent, named after José Barluenga, is a mild iodinating reagent. Commercially available, it may be prepared by reacting iodine with pyridine in the presence of silver tetrafluoroborate supported on silica gel.

References

Tetrafluoroborates
Iodine compounds
Reagents for organic chemistry
Phenyl compounds